or  Mōri Yoshimasa  was an officer for the Toyotomi clan following the sixteenth-century Azuchi-Momoyama period through the early years of the seventeenth-century Edo period in Japan.

Katsunaga fought in the Japanese invasions of Korea (1592–1598), and in the Battle of Sekigahara he joint the western legion but was defeated. Later, during the Siege of Osaka, Katsunaga, by tricking a guard, infiltrated Osaka castle. He defeated Honda Tadatomo (an officer for the Tokugawa) there in the summer.

References

Samurai
1577 births
1615 deaths
Japanese warriors killed in battle